The 2023 College Basketball Invitational (CBI) is a single-elimination, fully-bracketed men's college basketball postseason tournament featuring 16 National Collegiate Athletic Association (NCAA) Division I teams not selected to participate in the NCAA Division I men's basketball tournament or the National Invitation Tournament (NIT). The 15th edition of the tournament is scheduled to begin on March 18 and conclude on March 22. Semifinal and championship games will air on ESPN2.

Participating teams
Teams in the CBI were seeded 1–16.
Note: Team records are before playing in the tournament

Schedule

Bracket

*Denotes overtime period

References

External links
 College Basketball Invitational official website

College Basketball Invitational
College Basketball Invitational
College Basketball Inivtational
College Basketball Inivtational
Basketball competitions in Florida
College sports in Florida
Events in Daytona Beach, Florida